Hasan Tayeb Shamsuzzaman (born 9 January 1970) is a Bangladeshi football referee who has been a full international referee for FIFA.

Shamsuzzaman became a FIFA referee in 1999. He served as a referee at the 2002, 2010, and 2014 FIFA World Cup qualifiers, in addition to the AFC Champions League and West Asian Football Federation Championship. He also works as a sports teacher at Satkhira Day-Night College.

Shamsuzzaman retired from refereeing in 2016.

References 

1970 births
Living people
Bangladeshi football referees